The Tanja Liedtke Foundation (German: Tanja Liedtke Stiftung) is a German-based charity supporting modern and contemporary dance.

History
The foundation was established in July 2008 in honour of the dancer and choreographer, Tanja Liedtke who was killed in August 2007 before in a car accident in Sydney, Australia, two months after starting in the role as artistic director of the Sydney Dance Company.

Description
The Foundation's purpose is "to support the enrichment and advancement of contemporary dance theatre, and the development of Australian/European artistic connections." 

The Tanja Liedtke Foundation is registered as a tax-privileged organisation in Stuttgart, Germany as Tanja Liedtke Stiftung accordance with German law.

The Tanja Liedtke Gift Fund was established in Australia in 2008 as a sub-fund of the Perpetual Foundation Gift Fund. The Tanja Liedtke Gift Fund reflects the vision, aims and priorities of the Tanja Liedtke Foundation.

Fellowship 

The inaugural Tanja Liedtke Fellowship was offered, in partnership with Radialsystem V – New Space for the Arts (Berlin), and the contemporary dance company Sasha Waltz & Guests (Berlin), to an Australian dancer/choreographer between the ages of 20 and 35 years. It was awarded to Anthony Hamilton of Melbourne.

The 2011 Tanja Liedtke Fellowship was awarded to Katarzyna Sitarz, a Polish dancer/choreographer with a broad international experience in Poland, the Netherlands, Lithuania and Germany. She will direct her creative residency at Arts House Melbourne in March 2011 and participate in the development of a new collaboration by Australian choreographer Lucy Guerin.

International Choreographic Competition Hannover
The Foundation has collaborated for several years with the International Choreographic Competition Hannover at Staatstheater Hannover, in 2021 introducing a new production award at the competition.

References

External links 

Dance organizations
Charities based in Germany
Non-profit organisations based in Baden-Württemberg
Organisations based in Stuttgart